Stanley David Garrick, Egaibu of Siluko (8 June 1888 – 12 May 1958) was a senior administrator and courtier to Oba Akenzua II, the 37th Oba of the Kingdom of Benin, now in southern Nigeria. His father was a Sierra Leone Creole catechist called J. D. Garrick.

Professional life
Garrick was appointed to run Benin's postal service in 1923 after the Southern Nigerian Government had become responsible for managing the protectorate's postal system. He subsequently oversaw the growth of Benin's importance as a postal hub at a time when its delta location made water transport the preferred means of serving a region that lacked adequate roads.

Honour
In recognition of his services to Benin, baronial lands in the district of Siluko were settled on Garrick in 1943 as a personal gift of the Benin monarch, HRH Oba Akenzua II.

Private life
Garrick and his wife, Comfort Ramotu, had three sons and two daughters in a marriage lasting over four decades.

Last years
In later years, Garrick devoted his time to his farms and rubber plantations. However, the loss of his sight towards the end of his life curtailed the enjoyment of his estates. On his death in 1958, the Siluko barony passed to his eldest son and heir, George A. Garrick - better known as the holder of Nigeria's High Jump record between 1938 and 1953.

Descendants

Among Garrick's descendants are several grandchildren who have also dedicated themselves to public service. They include His Lordship Stanley Shenko Alagoa, retired Justice of the Nigerian Supreme Court and Officer of the Order of the Federal Republic (OFR); His Excellency Kayode Ralph Garrick, Grand Cross of the Order of Rio Branco, former Ambassador Extraordinary and Plenipotentiary of Nigeria to Brazil; Dr. Chike Gwam, international practitioner of paediatric and internal medicine; and Dr. (Mrs.) Abigail Funlayo Afiesimama (née Alagoa), a linguist and university lecturer.

Memorial
The Garrick Memorial School, a secondary school in Benin City, is named in honour of Stanley David Garrick and its ethos is based on his spirit of civic duty.

Sources
 Nigeria Direct 
 Garrick family 
 Palace of Benin 
 National Archives of Nigeria 
 Garrick Memorial School
 Vanguard newspaper archives
 Nigerian Bar Association
 John Harris Library of the University of Benin

1888 births
1958 deaths
Sierra Leone Creole people